Ralph O. Allen is a professor of chemistry and environmental sciences at the University of Virginia. He received his BA from Cornell College in 1965 and his Ph.D. in chemistry from the University of Wisconsin-Madison in 1970. He is a fellow of the Royal Norwegian Council for Scientific and Industrial Research (NTNF) and has been a Marshall Foundation Visiting Scholar in Norway.

References

Living people
Year of birth missing (living people)
University of Virginia faculty
Cornell College alumni
University of Wisconsin–Madison College of Letters and Science alumni
21st-century American chemists